Hibbertia oligocarpa is a species of flowering plant in the family Dilleniaceae and is endemic to part of the Arnhem Land plateau in the Northern Territory. It is a shrublet with spreading branches, broadly elliptic to round leaves and yellow flowers with 35 to 40 stamens arranged in groups around two carpels.

Description 
The foliage is covered with bundled, rosette-like hairs. There are 35 to 40 stamens in bundles around the two carpels, each with two ovules. Flowering occurs from January to June.

Taxonomy 
Hibbertia orbicularis was first formally described in 2010 by Hellmut R. Toelken in the Journal of the Adelaide Botanic Gardens from specimens collected near the headwater of the East Alligator River by Lyndley Craven and Glenn Wightman. The specific epithet (orbicularis) means "a small circle", referring to the shape of the leaves.

Distribution and habitat 
This hibbertia grows on sandstone ledges and slopes in the north-west part of the Arnhem Land plateau in the Northern Territory.

See also 
 List of Hibbertia species

References 

orbicularis
Flora of the Northern Territory
Plants described in 2010
Taxa named by Hellmut R. Toelken